Andrew O'Sullivan is an Australian Paralympic athlete.  At the 1988 Seoul Games, he won a gold medal in the Men's 4x400 m Relay A2A4–7 event and a  bronze medal in the Men's 400 m A4A9 event.

References

Paralympic athletes of Australia
Athletes (track and field) at the 1988 Summer Paralympics
Paralympic gold medalists for Australia
Paralympic bronze medalists for Australia
1964 births
Living people
Medalists at the 1988 Summer Paralympics
Paralympic medalists in athletics (track and field)
Australian male sprinters
Sprinters with limb difference
Paralympic sprinters